Weerasinghe Sujan Perera is a Sri Lankan professional footballer who plays as a goalkeeper for Up Country Lions and captains the Sri Lanka national team. He previously played for Kalutara Park in the Sri Lanka Football Premier League.

References

Sri Lankan footballers
1992 births
Living people
Sri Lanka international footballers
Association football goalkeepers
Kalutara Park SC players
Sri Lankan expatriate footballers
Sri Lankan expatriate sportspeople in the Maldives
Expatriate footballers in the Maldives
Club Eagles players
Sri Lanka Football Premier League players